The Wetaskiwin and District Heritage Museum, in Wetaskiwin, Alberta, Canada celebrates the history, heritage, and culture of Wetaskiwin and area. The museum serves the public by documenting and telling the stories of their local community, which includes the City of Wetaskiwin, County of Wetaskiwin, and the Maskwacis Cree Four Nations of Ermineskin, Louis Bull, Montana, and Samson.

Information
Visitors have year round access to the Museum to enjoy special events and view displays.
Canada Day and Pioneer Days celebrations and exhibit openings at the museum continue to be popular events, often marked by games, quizzes and contests. Each year the Museum has bestowed a "Pioneer of the Year Award" to honour an individual that has helped settle the area and has made a significant contribution to the community.

 Group tours and school tours are welcomed and continue to increase as children's programs are expanded and developed.
The Heritage Museum hosts hundreds of elementary school students each year in the Children's Legacy Center. Programs have been designed to enhance the curriculum of Grades K - 4. Hands-on activities are encouraged through play, as gentle touching is allowed in the Children's Museum.  Butter making, wool carding, using a scrub board to wash clothes and shopping in a vintage General store are some of the activities offered. School programs enable youngsters to experience life as it was for the early pioneers.

 It is the only museum dedicated to preserving and presenting the history of Wetaskiwin and central Alberta.

Featured exhibits include
  c. 1900 Century Home
  Women of Aspenland - 4 Additions each year
  Entertainment and Past Times (1890-1940)
  Origins Exhibit which includes Fur Trade, Native History and Interactive Computer Game

Location
The Wetaskiwin Heritage Museum is located between Edmonton and Red Deer in Alberta, Canada, 65 kilometres south of Edmonton.  The Museum is located on main street at 5007 - 50 Avenue.

History
The Wetaskiwin and District Heritage Museum has been incorporated as a non-profit society since May 1986. The museum provides for the acquisition, exhibition, and preservation of artefacts to interpret the natural, human, and cultural history of Wetaskiwin, the Cree Four Band Reserve, and the surrounding rural area.
 With the commitment of Society members, competent staff, dedicated volunteers, and the unfailing support of the community,
the museum has become the city's heritage house, preserving its history for future generations. In 2004, having outgrown the Calgary Power building, the Wetaskiwin and District Museum Society purchased the three-story, one-hundred-year-old Montgomery Store building situated on Main Street. The main floor opened in November 2004. The entire building-home to a collection of more than 15,000 artefacts-officially opened its doors on May 7, 2005, and now welcomes thousands of visitors each year.

Exhibits

Children's Legacy Centre 
The Children's Legacy Centre, located in the basement of the historic building, is a unique, hands-on permanent exhibit showcasing pioneer life. Kids are invited to experience a one-room schoolhouse, visit a pioneer kitchen, and explore other rooms while dressed in period clothing.

The Women of Aspenland
Every October, Canada celebrates Women's History Month. October was chosen because it is the month in which Canadian women officially became persons by law.  The Wetaskiwin & District Heritage Museum honours and celebrates the Women of Aspenland as an ongoing exhibit. It pays tribute to the many women who made their own unique contributions to the community of Wetaskiwin and area.   2008's inductees were Mary (Keogh) Christopher, Margaret (Todd) Emmett, Minnie Johnson, and Caroline (Dorchester) Shantz.

Temporary exhibits
The main floor features temporary exhibits which are changed on an annual basis. Presently featured is "Entertainment and Past Times" (1890-1940). The main floor also holds the Gift Shop, Front Desk, Donation Desk, Resource Library, and Public Washrooms.

Second floor exhibits

Origins Exhibit
The Origins Exhibit includes dinosaur fossils, archaeological artefacts, and facts about the local Cree Nations of Samson, Ermineskin, Montana, and Louis Bull. A fur trading post and a tipi are also included in the exhibit. There are also Interactive Games, where you can learn about Cree migration, bison, and fur trading.

Community Halls
After two years of research and more than 250 hours of exhibit design work, visitors are now welcome to explore the new "virtual" exhibit devoted to twenty-five Community Halls from the County of Wetaskiwin No. 10. Read the halls' histories and view hundreds of pictures on a touch screen computer.

Christian Heritage
The Christian Heritage exhibit contains information regarding 28 churches from the Wetaskiwin district, and displays artefacts from many different congregations.

History of Healing
A hundred years of history about the local hospitals and the healthcare professionals who served the community.

Early businesses
Wetaskiwin's earliest businesses include French's Jewellery, the local branches of seven different banks, the Driard Hotel and Barbershop, the Drug Store, a General Store, the City Meat Market, and local dairies.

Century Home
This turn-of-the-century town house features a circa 1910 living room, kitchen, master bedroom and child's room.

Immigrant stories
Immigration has had an enormous effect on Canada, and the Heritage Museum features exhibits devoted to the Swedish and Chinese immigrants who helped build the City of Wetaskiwin. "The Hutterites: A United People" also contains information about how these unchanging people face a changing world, allowing visitors to learn about the Hutterite history, religion, attire, beliefs, customs, and local presence.

War Years Remembered
Learn about Wetaskiwin's military history, and the local men and women who enlisted. This exhibit honours the courageous citizens who served on the home front and overseas. A war brides exhibit is also featured.

Resources and accessibility
Resource Library: The Museum's non-lending Resource Library, located on the main floor, is available for public use. Please ask a staff member if you would like access to the library.
Wheelchair Accessibility: Visitors disembark at the main entrance. The Heritage Museum has no barriers to entering the building from Main Street. Once inside, an elevator bypasses the stairways to the basement and second floor. A wheelchair accessible washroom is also available on the main floor.  Strollers and baby carriages are allowed in most galleries.

External links
  Museum Website
  Alberta Source
  Wetaskiwin Times Advertiser
  Alberta Museums Association
  City of Wetaskiwin
  Travel Alberta

Museums in Alberta
History museums in Alberta
Wetaskiwin